4 Months, 3 Weeks and 2 Days is a 2007 Romanian art film written and directed by Cristian Mungiu, starring Anamaria Marinca, Laura Vasiliu and Vlad Ivanov. The film is set in Communist Romania in the final years of the Nicolae Ceaușescu era. It tells the story of two students, roommates in a university dormitory, who try to procure an illegal abortion.

After making its world premiere on the first day at the Cannes Film Festival in May 2007, it won three awards, including the Palme d'Or. Mungiu became the first Romanian filmmaker to win the Palme d'Or, the festival's highest honour. Later, it became the first Romanian work to receive the European Film Award for Best Film. It also won Best Film at Romania's national Gopo Awards.

Despite competing for the Academy Award for Best Foreign Language Film, 4 Months, 3 Weeks and 2 Days was not shortlisted, creating controversy among critics and online film fans, as it had won the Palme d'Or. The controversy caused an Academy member to pledge nomination reform, though the category had often sparked criticism. Mungiu later said the omission and subsequent furor brought the picture substantial publicity, and that the experience taught him that critics and festival juries have differing tastes from the Academy.

Accolades

References

External links 
 

Lists of accolades by film